The European Karate Championships are organised by the European Karate Federation each year.

History
Events from 1966 to 1996 were organized by the European Karate Union.  In 1961, Jacques Delcourt was appointed President of French Karate, which was at that stage, an associated member of the Judo Federation. In 1963, he invited six other known European federations (Italy, Great Britain, Belgium, Germany, Switzerland and Spain) to come to France for the first-ever international karate event. Great Britain and Belgium accepted the invitation.

By 1965, the European Karate Union was created with Jacques Delcourt voted in as President. The following year the first European Karate Championships were held in Paris. The event drew roughly three hundred spectators and was shown live on television. It drew criticism for being too violent as there were many facial injuries. The EKU council had differing opinions about the cause(s) of the injuries. With opinions ranging from excessive violations of rules to lack of conditioning and blocking skill, this problem was addressed in some part, at the first referee course held in Rome. At that time, the refereeing rules were harmonised using the JKA rules as a basis.

The 2023 event was scheduled to be held in Moscow, Russia but the country was stripped of the right to host the event after the 2022 Russian invasion of Ukraine.

Championships
EKU Championships (1966–1992) and EKF Championships (since 1993). Para Karate was added to championships since 2018.

Medals

All-time medal table Karate (1966-2022) 
The following reflects the all-time medal counts as of the 1966 European Karate Championships:

All-time medal table Para Karate (2018-2021) 
The following reflects the all-time medal counts as of the 2018 European Karate Championships:

Medals table Europe Cadet, Junior and U21 (2000-2021) 
The following reflects the all-time medal counts as of the 2000 European Karate Cadet, Junior and U21 Championships:

See also
 European Juniors Karate Championships
 :fr:Championnats d'Europe de karaté juniors et cadets

References

External links
 European Karate Federation

 
Karate in Europe
Karate competitions
European championships
Recurring sporting events established in 1966